Nikolay Hristozov may refer to:

 Nikolai Hristozov (1931–2015), Bulgarian writer and poet
 Nikolay Hristozov (footballer) (born 1982), Bulgarian footballer